Events in the year 1995 in Turkey.

Parliament
19th Parliament of Turkey (up to 24 December)
20th Parliament of Turkey

Incumbents
President – Süleyman Demirel
Prime Minister – Tansu Çiller 
Leader of the opposition – Mesut Yılmaz

Ruling party and the main opposition
 Ruling party – True Path Party (DYP)
 Main opposition – Motherland Party (ANAP)

Cabinet
50th government of Turkey (up to 5 October)
51st government of Turkey (5 October – 30 October)
52nd government of Turkey (from 30 October)

Events
4 January – Two parties with the same background, namely Social Democratic Populist Party (SHP) and Republican People's Party (CHP) decided to merge. 
 12 February – Although SHP was the bigger partner, Erdal İnönü, the former leader of SHP proposed that the fusion should be in CHP.
12 February – Because of dense smog, schools were temporarily closed in İstanbul.
18 February – SHP merged with the CHP and Hikmet Çetin was elected as the caretaker leader of CHP.
12/13 March – Gazi Quarter riots in İstanbul
20 March – Operation Steel launched against Kurdish separatists
11 April – Tansu Çiller started irrigation through the Şanlıurfa Irrigation Tunnels 
21 May – Beşiktaş won the championship of the Turkish football league
12 June – 22 soldiers were killed by Kurdish separatists in Tunceli Province
7 July – Operation against Kurdish separatists around the Iraq border
25 July – Gold exchange market was opened
29 August – Flood in Rize; 10 deaths
 7 September – Militants killed 9 workers in Hatay Province
15 September – Clash between government forces and militants in Diyarbakır Province
1 October – Earthquake in Dinar, Afyonkarahisar; 90 deaths
9 September – Deniz Baykal was elected as the new president of CHP
19 September – Tansu Çiller and Deniz Baykal could not agree on the coalition protocol and the 50th government dissolved (but continued up to the formation of the new government)
13 October – Tansu Çiller’s 2nd government (founded on 5 October) lost a vote of confidence
5 November – Tansu Çiller’s 3rd government (founded on 30 October, with their coalition partner CHP) received the vote of confidence
13 December – Customs Union with European Union
24 December – General elections :Welfare Party 158 seats, ANAP 132 seats, DYP 135 seats, DSP 76 seats, CHP 49 seats

Deaths
11 January – Onat Kutlar (born in 1936), writer
18 March – Sadri Alışık (born in 1925), actor
25 March – Belgin Doruk (born in 1936), actress
6 July – Aziz Nesin (born in 1915), writer humorist
10 July – Mehmet Ali Aybar (born 1908), politician
27 July – Melih Esenbel (born in 1915), diplomat
27 September – Baha Akşit (born in 1914), politician

Gallery

See also
1994-95 1.Lig
Turkey in the Eurovision Song Contest 1995

References

 
Years of the 20th century in Turkey
Turkey
Turkey
Turkey